A Million Degrees is the third studio album by the industrial rock band Emigrate. It was released on November 30, 2018, via Vertigo Records. First recorded in 2015, the album was destroyed in a flood in 2017, and had to be re-recorded. Recording sessions took place at Studio Engine 55 in Berlin with drums recorded at Funkhaus Studio. It features guest appearances from Ben Kowalewicz, Cardinal Copia, Margaux Bossieux and Till Lindemann.

Frontman Richard Kruspe's equipment included ESP Guitars, Mesa Boogie Rectifier amps, Pro Tools and Native Instruments.

Music videos for "1234" and "You Are So Beautiful" were shot in Los Angeles directed by Bill Yukich and released on October 18 and November 30, 2018, respectively. The video for "War" was directed by David Gesslbauer and released on March 5, 2019.

Track listing

Personnel 

Richard Kruspe – guitars, vocals, keyboards, electro sequencer, lyrics
Terry Matlin – lyrics
Thomas Borman – lyrics (track 5)
Till Lindemann – lyrics & vocals (track 8)
Margaux Bossieux – lyrics & vocals (track 4), backing vocals
Olsen Involtini – vocal recording & production, drum recording & engineering, backing vocals
Tom Dalgety – vocal recording (track 9)
Sky Van Hoff – additional guitar recording & production, bass, mixing
Sascha Moser – drum editing
Possi Possberg – drum tuning
Arnaud Giroux – backing vocals, bass
Meral Al Me – backing vocals
Kriss Jacob – backing vocals
Steve Binetti – additional solo guitar (tracks: 1, 11)
Mikko Sirén – drums
Svante Forsbäck – mastering
Benjamin Kowalewicz – vocals (track 2)
Tobias Forge – vocals (track 9)
Sven Kaselow – management
Birgit Fordyce – management
Stefan Mehnert – management
Büro Dirk Rodolph – artwork
Gregor Hohenberg – photography
Anthony Kurtz – photography

Charts

References

External links

2018 albums
Emigrate (band) albums
Vertigo Records albums